Vyacheslav Sirin (3 September 1924 – 12 September 1970) was a Russian-born Estonian actor.

He was born in Moscow.

In 1948 he graduated from GITIS. From 1948 to 1970 he worked at the Russian Theatre in Tallinn.

Besides stage roles he has also acted in films.

Filmography

 1958 "Esimese järgu kapten" (Lenfilm)
 1961 "Kirev reis" (Lenfilm)
 1968 "Virineya" (Lenfilm)

References

1924 births
1970 deaths
Estonian male film actors
Estonian male stage actors
Russian male film actors
Russian male stage actors
Soviet male film actors
Russian expatriates in Estonia
Male actors from Moscow